St Paul's Church, Coven is a Grade II listed parish church in the Church of England in Coven, Staffordshire

History

The church was built in 1857 by architect Edward Banks. It had a gallery with total seating capacity of 396. The contractor was built by Godfrey of Birmingham.

It was consecrated by the Bishop of Lichfield on 5 February 1857.

The churchyard contains two war graves of British Army soldiers of World War II.

See also
Listed buildings in Brewood and Coven

References

Church of England church buildings in Staffordshire
Churches completed in 1857
Grade II listed buildings in Staffordshire
1857 establishments in England